Mantica horni is a species of beetle in the family Cicindelidae, the only species in the genus Mantica.

References

Cicindelidae
Monotypic Adephaga genera